Sathi is a 2002 Indian Bengali-language romantic drama film directed by  Haranath Chakraborty. It stars Jeet and Priyanka Trivedi, with the former making his debut. It served as the Bengali remake of the Tamil film,  Thulladha Manamum Thullum (1999) and became the highest-grossing Bengali film of that year.

Sathi is notable for being the debut film of actor Jeet, who achieved a major career breakthrough through the same. Haranath Mukherjee, besides directing the film, co-wrote the screenplay along with Monotosh Chakraborty. V. Prabhakar handled the cinematography while the editing was finished by Swapan Guha. S. P. Venkatesh composed the film's music.

Upon its release on 14 June 2002, Sathi emerged a commercially and critically successful venture, eventually becoming the highest-grossing Bengali film of the year and subsequently, one of the highest-grossers of Bengali cinema. Jeet received appraisals for his performance; he was conferred with a BFJA Award.

Plot
Bijoy is an aspiring, talented singer, who resides in a village of Burdwan district. He has a caring and loving mother and a helpful brother. He comes to Calcutta on the call of a musical tycoon but when he finally arrives at his home Bijoy is shocked to find his mentor dead. He takes refuge with the alcoholic Keshtoda, who has a heart of gold. He architects a group of peers and all of them begin to work for an insurance company. In the meanwhile Bijoy views Sonali who stays in the same locality with her grandmother. Sonali knows Bijoy in a peculiar way. She has never seen him, but when Bijoy chants his numbers, she hears them utmost interest and becomes his ardent admirer. But whenever Bijoy and Sonali physically meet each other, mishaps occur which make Sonali misunderstand. Thus Sonali has a different picture of Bijoy in her sub-consciousness. She does not realize that the one she admires is the same person whom she hates. Things come to standstill, when Bijoy accidentally pushes Sonali from the stairs of her college and she becomes blind. When Bijoy learns of this, he is shattered. Then begins his series of sacrifices and love, he helps the financially strained Sonali and her grandmother by giving their rent. He brings the duo at their mess when they are expelled by their landlord and finally he sells the precious ring (Bijoy's mother's gift) to allocate the fees and cost required for Sonali's eye treatment. Even when his mother expires he keeps it a secret to everyone and takes Sonali to the eye surgeon. There he knows that Sonali can regain her eyesight if she undergoes an acute and complex operation. Bijoy sacrifices his passion to become a vocalist and secretly supports Sonali to fulfill her dream of becoming a singer, while Sonali has success in her first stint at the recording studios, Bijoy is arrested as a terrorist on the platform of Vizag station. Thus with Bijoy's money Sonali regains eyesight and becomes a famous singer while Bijoy is sentenced to five years of rigorous imprisonment. The day Bijoy returns after completing his sentence turns out to be the same day when Sonali was attending her musical concert. Bijoy after arriving at Howrah station eyes the hoardings of having huge cutouts of Sonali. He reaches the spot but when he tries to contact Sonali and explain to her that he is her Bijoy, he is brutally hammered by the security. Keshtoda and Bijoy's friend arrive at the juncture. They explain the truth to Sonali. Sonali realises that the one she has neglected is her long-lost love. They reunite amidst a jubilant crowd.

Cast
The cast is listed below:
 Jeet as Bijoy
 Priyanka Trivedi as Sonali
 Ranjit Mallick as Keshto Da
 Anamika Saha as Sonali's grandmother
 Rajesh Sharma 
 Kanchan Mullick as Bijoy's friend
 Sumitra Mukherjee as Bijoy's mother
 Pushpita Mukherjee as Sonali's friend
 Shyamal Dutta
 Premjit Mukherjee as Member of Rock Band (cameo)
 Sagnik Chatterjee as Head Member of Rock Band (cameo)
 Sanghamitra Bandopadhyay as Keshto Da's wife
 Ramen Roy Chowdhury

Soundtrack

References

External links
 

2002 films
Bengali-language Indian films
Bengali remakes of Tamil films
2002 romantic drama films
2000s Bengali-language films
Indian romantic musical films
Films scored by S. P. Venkatesh
Indian romantic drama films
2000s romantic musical films
Films directed by Haranath Chakraborty